Islam Serry (born 16 January 1992 in Ismailia) is an Egyptian footballer who plays for Tala'ea El Gaish .

References

1992 births
Living people
Egyptian footballers
Egypt international footballers
Association football defenders